Alpha-neoagaro-oligosaccharide hydrolase (alpha-neoagarooligosaccharide hydrolase, alpha-NAOS hydrolase) is an enzyme with systematic name alpha-neoagaro-oligosaccharide 3-glycohydrolase. This enzyme catalyses the following chemical reaction

 Hydrolysis of the (1->3)-alpha-L-galactosidic linkages of neoagaro-oligosaccharides that are smaller than a hexamer, yielding 3,6-anhydro-L-galactose and D-galactose

When neoagarohexaose is used as a substrate, the oligosaccharide is cleaved at the non-reducing end to produce 3,6-anhydro-L-galactose and agaropentaose, which is further hydrolysed to agarobiose and agarotriose.

References

External links 
 

EC 3.2.1